is a metro station on the Osaka Metro in Chūō-ku, Osaka, Japan, and also called "".

Lines

 (T24)
 (N18)

Layout
This station has an island platform with two tracks for each line, and the platform for the Nagahori Tsurumi-ryokuchi Line is fenced with platform gates.  Ticket gates are located on upper level than the south and the center of the platform for the Tanimachi Line and on upper level than the center of the platform for the Nagahori Tsurumi-ryokuchi Line.
Tanimachi Line

Nagahori Tsurumi-ryokuchi Line

Surroundings
the headquarters of Mandom Corporation
the headquarters of SSK Corp.
Karahori Shopping Arcade, the center of a town that did not get destroyed during the Bombing of Osaka.
Osaka Prefectural Shimizudani High School

External links

 Official Site - Tanimachi Line 
 Official Site - Tanimachi Line 
 Official Site - Nagahori Tsurumi-ryokuchi line 
 Official Site - Nagahori Tsurumi-ryokuchi line

References

Chūō-ku, Osaka
Osaka Metro stations
Railway stations in Japan opened in 1968